Jean-Luc Migué born in Saint-Jacques (Québec) in 1933, is a Canadian economist. He is a senior fellow at the Fraser Institute of Vancouver and at the Montreal Economic Institute.

Education
Migué graduated in 1953, with a cum laude mention, from the Collège de l'Assomption and holds a master's degree in economics from the Université de Montréal. From 1958 to 1960, he was a research student at the London School of Economics and Political Science. In 1968, he received a PhD in economics from the American University of Washington.

Career
Migué is an international expert on public choice theory. He has been a professor at Université Laval and l’École nationale d’administration publique (ÉNAP), a researcher at the Bank of Canada and the Economic Council of Canada, and chairman of the academic board of the Montreal Economic Institute.

He has been a member of many working groups and a consultant for several public and private organisations. He is a member of the Mont Pelerin Society and Fellow of the Royal Society of Canada.

He has also been a member of the Canadian Economics Association, the Canadian Society of Economic Science, the Public Choice Society and the American Economic Association. Moreover, he often participates in public debates in newspapers, news magazines, and radio and television broadcasts.

Filmography
He is featured in the documentary The Encirclement in which he outlined his libertarian arguments. One of his points is that particular family allowances paid to single women raising children leads women to have children outside marriage.

Bibliography
 Le Québec d'aujourd'hui : regards d'universitaires, Montréal, HMH Hurtubise, 1971.
 Le prix de la santé, with Gérard Bélanger, Montréal, Hurtubise HMH, 1972. (Also published in English)
 Le prix du transport au Québec, with Gérard Bélanger et Michel Boucher, Québec, Éditeur officiel/Ministère des transports, 1978.
 L'économiste et la chose publique, Montréal, Presses de l'Université du Québec/Toronto, Institut d'administration publique du Canada, 1979.

Articles and chapters 
He has published numerous articles in Canadian and international journals, such as the Canadian Journal of Economics/Revue Canadienne d'Économique , the Cato Journal, the Actualité économique, the Journal of Law and Economics, the Revue économique, Public Choice, the Revue Française de Finances Publiques, Hacienda Publica Española, and the Journal des Économistes et des Études Humaines.

References

External links

Books 
 Le monopole public de l'éducation : l'économie politique de la médiocrité, with Richard Marceau, Sillery, Presses de l'Université du Québec, 1989.
 Federalism and Free Trade, Institute of Economic Affairs, 1993. In 1994, he was awarded the Silver Medal of Sir Antony Fisher Memorial Award for this book (which is also published in Portuguese).
 Une société sclérosée – quand le mal européen gagne le Canada (l'Étincelle, Montréal, 1994)
 Le choix en éducation : levier de qualité et d'efficacité!, 2 t., ENAP/Sainte-Catherine, Collège Charles-Lemoyne, 2 t., Québec, 1996.
 Étatisme et déclin du Québec, Varia and Montreal Economic Institute 1999.
 Le monopole de la santé au banc des accusés, Varia, 2001 
 Santé publique, santé en danger, éditions de l'Institut Charles Coquelin, décembre 2005.

Other links 
 Fiche on www.quebecoislibre.org
 Fiche on the Website of the Presses de l'Université du Québec

Living people
1933 births
American University alumni
Canadian economists
Canadian libertarians
Public choice theory
Université de Montréal alumni
Academic staff of Université Laval